Stravomyti Cave is an ancient Minoan cave on Crete.

Geography
The Stravomyti Cave is 400 meters above sea level on Mt. Juktas' southwest slope.

Archaeology
The Stravomyti Cave first saw use during Neolithic times, as a refuge and burial.  During the Early Minoan period, the quality of pottery suggests that people lived in the caves.  Thereafter, it was used for storage and worship.

The cave may have once been a shrine to a female deity - Artemis, Diktynna or perhaps Eileithyia.

References

 Sakellarakis, J. and E. 1991 Crete Archanes  (guidebook)

Neolithic sites in Crete
Minoan sites in Crete
Ancient caves of Greece